The ), also known as the , is a hill in Heingang, Imphal East district of .

The Government of Manipur developed Marjing Polo Statue, the world's tallest equestrian statue of a polo player, standing inside the Marjing Polo Complex, which is on the hilltop of the Heingang Ching, being historically, mythologically and religiously associated with the game of polo.

Marjing Polo Complex 

The total area of the Marjing Polo Complex is 23 acres, spreading over the Marjing hills with the grazing ground of the Meitei horses covering an area of about four acres.

Polo Ground 
A Polo Ground is planed to be made in the hillock of the Heingang Ching (Marjing Hill).

Transport 
Cable cars are planed to be made available for public service from the Langol Ching to the Heingang Ching (Marjing Hill) and from the Heingang Ching (Marjing Hill) to the Kangla Fort for the tourists.

See also 
 Kangla
 Kangla Nongpok Thong
 Kangla Nongpok Torban
 Loktak Lake
 Manung Kangjeibung
 Mount Manipur
 Mount Manipur Memorial

Notes

References

External links 
 Heingang Ching at Wikimapia
 Heingang Ching at 

Cultural heritage of India
Hills of Manipur
Landmarks in India
Meitei culture
Meitei pilgrimage sites
Mountains in Sanamahism
Sacred mountains
Tourist attractions in India